The Coolpix P80 is a point-and-shoot digital camera produced by Nikon that was introduced in April 2008.

Its image sensor is a CCD with 10.1 megapixels. It has an 18x optical zoom lens that is not interchangeable.

The Coolpix P80 was superseded in March 2009 by the Nikon Coolpix P90.

Features

Its image sensor is a CCD with 10.1 megapixels. It has a  thin-film transistor LCD screen with 230,000 pixels. The P80 comes with an 18x optical zoom Nikkor fixed lens that is not interchangeable, and with vibration reduction (VR) optical image stabilization. Its image processor provides face-priority autofocus, in-camera red-eye fix, D-lighting, backlight and panorama assist.

The camera can record video in AVI-format at up to 480p (VGA) at 30 frames per second, and audio in WAV-format.

Its interface is a USB port that can be used to connect the camera directly to a printer that supports PictBridge.

Video output can be selected between NTSC and PAL.

A fully charged battery is sufficient to take approximately 250 shots.

References

External links

P0080